Ilyas Magomedovich Kurkaev (born 18 January 1994) is a Russian volleyball player, member of the Russia men's national volleyball team and Russian club Lokomotiv Novosibirsk. He participated at the 2017 European Championship.

Sporting achievements

Clubs
 National championships
 2019/2020  Russian Championship, with Lokomotiv Novosibirsk

Youth national team
 2013  FIVB U21 World Championship

Universiade
 2015  Summer Universiade

Individual awards
 2013: FIVB U21 World Championship – Best Middle Blocker
 2017: Memorial of Hubert Jerzy Wagner – Best Middle Blocker

References

External links
 Player profile at CEV.eu
 Player profile at WorldofVolley.com
 Player profile at Volleybox.net

1994 births
Living people
People from Biysk
Russian men's volleyball players
Universiade medalists in volleyball
Universiade gold medalists for Russia
Medalists at the 2015 Summer Universiade
Volleyball players at the 2020 Summer Olympics
Olympic volleyball players of Russia
Medalists at the 2020 Summer Olympics
Olympic silver medalists for the Russian Olympic Committee athletes
Olympic medalists in volleyball
Sportspeople from Altai Krai